William Magee Crozier (5 December 1873 in Dublin, Ireland – 1 July 1916 in Thiepval, France) was an Irish cricketer. A right-handed batsman, he played one first-class match for Dublin University against Leicestershire in June 1895.

He was a barrister by profession who served as a Lieutenant in the 9th battalion of the Royal Inniskilling Fusiliers and was killed in action on the first day on the Somme during the First World War.

References

1873 births
1916 deaths
Irish cricketers
Dublin University cricketers
Cricketers from County Dublin
Royal Inniskilling Fusiliers officers
British Army personnel of World War I
British military personnel killed in the Battle of the Somme
Military personnel from Dublin (city)